Hello! How Are You? is a 2011 Romanian romantic comedy film directed by Alexandru Maftei. The film follows a couple whose relationship has become routine and stale after 20 years of marriage.

Release
The film was screened at the Brussels Film Festival with the support of ICR Brussels.

Awards

It was nominated at the Gopo Awards for best cinematography, best editing, best original score, and best make-up. It won the award for best make-up.

Cast
 Dana Voicu as Gabriela 
 Ionel Mihăilescu as Gabriel 
 Paul Diaconescu as Vladimir
 Ana Popescu as Toni 
 Ioan Andrei Ionescu as Marcel 
 Sabrina Iașchevici as Miruna Jipescu (as Sabrina Iașchievici)
 Adrian Păduraru  as Teacher
 Antoaneta Cojocaru as Natalia
 Ioana Abur as Silvia  
 Adrian Buliga as George
 Cristi Toma as Tomiță
 Sergiu Marin as Sebi
 Gabriel Spahiu as Iorgu  (as Gabi Spahiu)
 Iulia Boroș as Luminița

References

External links
  
 
 
 

2011 films
2010s Romanian-language films
Films directed by Alexandru Maftei
Films shot in Romania
2011 romantic comedy films
Teensploitation
Romanian romantic comedy films